Basilissopsis rhyssa is a species of sea snail, a marine gastropod mollusc in the family Seguenziidae.

Description
The height of the shell attains 2.1 mm. The shell is very similar to the shell of Basilissopsis watsoni Dautzenberg & H. Fischer, 1897. The shell is nacreous and the outer lip possesses posterior and basal labral sinuses.

Distribution
This marine species occurs in the Gulf of Mexico, in the Caribbean Sea off Cuba and in the Atlantic Ocean off Georgia.

References

 Rosenberg, G., F. Moretzsohn, and E. F. García. 2009. Gastropoda (Mollusca) of the Gulf of Mexico, pp. 579–699 in Felder, D.L. and D.K. Camp (eds.), Gulf of Mexico–Origins, Waters, and Biota. Biodiversity. Texas A&M Press, College Station, Texas.

rhyssa
Gastropods described in 1927